Dean Lester Pullar (born 11 May 1973 in Melbourne, Victoria) is an Australian diver, who won a bronze medal in the 2000 Summer Olympics alongside Robert Newbery. He was an Australian Institute of Sport scholarship holder. Dean currently owns and runs the family cold store warehouse situated on the old family orchard in Cobram, Victoria.

References

External links 
 
 
 
 

1973 births
Living people
Australian male divers
Australian Institute of Sport divers
Olympic divers of Australia
Olympic bronze medalists for Australia
Olympic medalists in diving
Divers at the 1994 Commonwealth Games
Divers at the 1998 Commonwealth Games
Divers at the 2000 Summer Olympics
Divers at the 2004 Summer Olympics
Medalists at the 2000 Summer Olympics
World Aquatics Championships medalists in diving
Commonwealth Games silver medallists for Australia
Commonwealth Games medallists in diving
Universiade medalists in diving
Universiade bronze medalists for Australia
Divers from Melbourne
People educated at Scotch College, Melbourne
Medalists at the 1997 Summer Universiade
Medalists at the 1999 Summer Universiade
20th-century Australian people
21st-century Australian people
Medallists at the 1998 Commonwealth Games